Macrochenus isabellinus is a species of beetle in the family Cerambycidae. It was described by Per Olof Christopher Aurivillius in 1920. It is known from Thailand, Laos, China, Myanmar, and Vietnam.

References

Lamiini
Beetles described in 1920